Ghawari (sometimes called Ghowari, Gowari, Oaree, Wali, and Gwali) is a small agricultural town and oasis in Ghanche District, Baltistan, Pakistan. There is a suspension bridge over the Shyok in the southeast of the town which leads to Kuroo on the other side of the river. It is well known as a center of Islamic scholarship and learning and for its production of cherries and associated festival.

History
The population of Ghawari district at the end of the 19th century was 19,445 people. In 1951, Ghawari itself had a population of 1691 people.

References

External links
Tibet Encyclopedia

Populated places in Ghanche District
Baltistan